Anantharam is a village located in Gummadidal Mandal of SangaReddy, Telangana 502313, India.

The village has a temple with an ancient history,

In this temple we can participate in Lingabhishekam ourselves.  The temple was later renamed as Veera harda, Veera Hanuman Sametha Bhavani shakankara Swamy Temple as it has an ancient history dating back to a few hundred years.  Swami appears in the form of an ancient Shivalinga from the Kakatiya period.  ⁇

References

External links

Villages in Medak district